6500 Kodaira, provisional designation , is a highly eccentric, rare-type asteroid and sizable Mars-crosser from the central regions of the asteroid belt, approximately 10 kilometers in diameter. It was discovered on 15 March 1993, by Japanese amateur astronomers Kin Endate and Kazuro Watanabe at Kitami Observatory in eastern Hokkaidō, Japan. It was named for Japanese astronomer Keiichi Kodaira.

Orbit and classification 

Kodaira orbits the Sun at a distance of 1.6–3.9 AU once every 4 years and 7 months (1,670 days). Its orbit has an eccentricity of 0.42 and an inclination of 29° with respect to the ecliptic.

Physical characteristics 

In the SMASS classification, Kodaira is carbonaceous and uncommon B-type asteroid, of which only a few dozen bodies are currently known.

Rotation period 

In October 2014, a rotational lightcurve of Kodaira was obtained from photometric observations by American astronomer Robert Stephens at the Center for Solar System Studies in California. Lightcurve analysis gave a well-defined rotation period of  hours with a brightness variation of 0.78 magnitude.

Previous observations at Montgomery College Observatory (MCO), the Preston Gott and McDonald Observatories, and at the Palomar Transient Factory gave similar periods between 5.398 and 5.496 hours.

Diameter and albedo 

According to first-year results from the NEOWISE mission of NASA's Wide-field Infrared Survey Explorer, Kodaira measures 9.5 kilometers in diameter and its surface has an albedo of 0.15, while the Collaborative Asteroid Lightcurve Link assumes a standard albedo for carbonaceous asteroids of 0.057 and calculates a diameter of 16.8 kilometers with an absolute magnitude of 12.6.

Naming 

This minor planet was named after Keiichi Kodaira (born 1937), Japanese astronomer and director of NAOJ, whose interests lie in astrophysics and galactic physics.

In the 1980s, Kodaira was head of IAU's commission of Theory of Stellar Atmospheres (comm. 36). He was also instrumental for the completion of the Subaru Telescope project, of which he was the scientific director since its inception. The approved naming citation was published by the Minor Planet Center on 1 June 1996.

References

External links 
 Asteroid Lightcurve Database (LCDB), query form (info )
 Dictionary of Minor Planet Names, Google books
 Asteroids and comets rotation curves, CdR – Observatoire de Genève, Raoul Behrend
 Discovery Circumstances: Numbered Minor Planets (5001)-(10000) – Minor Planet Center
 
 

006500
Discoveries by Kin Endate
Discoveries by Kazuro Watanabe
Named minor planets
006500
19930315